Tommaso Caudera (born July 26, 1907 in Turin) was an Italian professional football player.

1907 births
Year of death missing
Italian footballers
Serie A players
Juventus F.C. players
Casale F.B.C. players
Association football midfielders
Asti Calcio F.C. players
A.S.D. La Biellese players